The Borel military monoplane (company designation: Bo.14) was a French single-engine, two-seat aircraft designed shortly before World War I in response to a French Army requirement for an aircraft to seek and destroy enemy balloon airships.

Design and development 

The Military Monoplane had an unconventional design, owing to its unique mission requirement. The pilot and observer sat side by side in an open cockpit within a pod or nacelle that also carried a high monoplane wing and the engine driving a pusher propeller. The pod also featured windows on each side, near the crew members' feet to facilitate downwards visibility when hunting balloons. A cruciform empennage was carried on an open truss of triangular cross-section, the upper longeron of which passed through the propeller hub. Despite reportedly good flying characteristics, the idea never passed beyond the construction of a single prototype.

Specifications

See also

References

Bibliography
 
 , archived at: The Wayback Machine
 Aero and Hydro September 13, 1913

1910s French fighter aircraft
Monoplane
Single-engined pusher aircraft
High-wing aircraft
Aircraft first flown in 1913
Rotary-engined aircraft